Cornifrons albidiscalis is a moth in the family Crambidae. It was described by George Hampson in 1916. It is found in Kenya and South Africa.

References

Evergestinae
Moths described in 1916